Diabolepis (or Diabolichthys) is an extinct genus of very primitive lungfish which lived about 400 million years ago, in the Early Devonian period of South China. Diabolepis is the most basal known dipnoan.

A rather small fish, the fossil has risen to prominence as it has four nares like most fish, while modern lungfish have only two, the hindmost pair having moved on to the palate serving as choanae. This proved that the internal nares of lungfish had evolved independently of those in tetrapods. This has made the internal nares a case of parallel evolution rather than a homology between lungfish and tetrapods.

Characteristics
Diabolepis has a prominent snout; the more recurvature the snout, the greater is the proportion of the premaxilla that is included within the mouth cavity. The teeth within the premaxilla are folded with polyplocodont structure. The maxilla was either toothless or absent or there may have been a gap between the premaxilla and the maxilla. There is an intracranial joint or ventral fissure, two external nostrils, and separate enthopterygoids. One or several bones lie lateral to the anterior end of the postparietals. The skull roof has an incipient "B" bone between the postparietals. The rest of the skull roof has a tendency towards fragmentation into small bones. The endocranium is divided.  The anterior nostril lies at the mouth margin. There can only be a narrow space between nostril and mouth, and an interrupted canal has been scored for Diabolepis.

References

Prehistoric lungfish genera
Devonian bony fish
Fossils of China